Scărișoara is a commune located in Alba County, Transylvania, Romania. It is composed of fourteen villages: Bârlești, Botești (Botesbánya), Fața-Lăzești, Florești, Lăzești (Lezest), Lespezea, Maței, Negești, Preluca, Runc, Scărișoara, Sfoartea, Știuleți, and Trâncești.

The commune is situated in the Țara Moților ethnogeographical region of the Apuseni Mountains, at the foot of the Bihor Massif.

Scărișoara is located in the northwestern corner of Alba County, on the border with Cluj County and near the border with Bihor County.

The commune is crossed by national road , which runs from a major junction in Turda, Cluj County, through Câmpeni and Scărișoara, and on to Ștei, Bihor County, where it connects to European route E79.

As of the 2011, the commune had a population of 1,661, of which 82% were ethnic Romanians and 15.29% Roma.

References

External links
Scărișoara on www.ghidulprimariilor.ro
Scărișoara on www.sate-comune.ro

Communes in Alba County
Localities in Transylvania